Dittrichia is a genus of flowering plants in the daisy family. Its species were formerly included in the genus Inula.

Dittrichia is named after German botanist Manfred Dittrich (born 1934), the previous director of the herbarium at the Botanical Garden in Berlin.

 Species
 Dittrichia graveolens, stinkwort, sticky stinkweed - Mediterranean region (southern Europe + North Africa) plus southwest Asia as far east as Pakistan; naturalized in California, Asia, Africa, Australia, and other places
 Dittrichia viscosa, false yellowhead, yellow fleabane - Mediterranean region (southern Europe + North Africa)

References

Inuleae
Asteraceae genera